The Bufi Government better known as the Government of Stability was an interim government formed after the resignation of the previous Nano government due to the aggravated situation in the country after the events of 2 April 1991 where 4 opposition supporters were killed in Shkodër during a anti-communist protest that led to the burning of the Shkodra Labor Party Committee. The Nano government resigned on 4 June 1991, and the next day the then-President Ramiz Alia, began negotiations to form a comprehensive government whose main objective would be to restore stability to the country, from which it took the name "Stability Government". Ylli Bufi was accepted also by the opposition to be appointed as Prime Minister, while one of the most prominent figures of the Democratic Party, such as Gramoz Pashko, was appointed Deputy Prime Minister.

Background
The Labor Party had won the 31 March 1991 parliamentary elections, which were also supposed to bring about a change in the system of government from dictatorship to democracy. But it was the party that had ruled for 45 years that won over 2/3 of Parliament. However, the Democratic Party and its allies had won in the main cities of the country by providing greater support to the most educated people. During the two Nano governments in Albania, strikes began that culminated in a hunger strike by Valias miners in Tirana. The country was embroiled in unrest and then-President Ramiz Alia agreed to form a joint PPSH-PD government with a prime minister from the main political force, on the condition that a year later there would be early elections.

Meanwhile, the Labour Party organizes its congress on 12 June 1991 and announces the establishment of the Socialist Party. Fatos Nano was elected chairman of the party.

Berisha, dissatisfied with the work of the government, was afraid of the fact that the Democrats could lose the support of the people and be considered responsible for the difficult situation in the country. On 26 November 1991, the National Council of the Democratic Party submitted 4 demands as conditions for its stay in government:
 Arrest of the so-called Bllokmens (including Nexhmije Hoxha)
 Dismissal of the general director of RTSH
 Finding the culprits for the April 2 murders in Shkodër
 Bring the election date closer

On 4 December, Berisha ousted Democratic ministers from the government and the Stability Government resigned. Neritan Ceka, at the time deputy chairman of the Democratic Party, left the party accusing Sali Berisha of using undemocratic means to overthrow the government. He called the removal of Democratic ministers from the government "a resignation from a historic responsibility."

Cabinet
The government held office from 11 June 1991 until 6 December 1991 and there were no cabinet changes. Despite the fact that the negotiations started with the agreement between the Democratic Party and the Labor Party, the day after the formation of the government was held the Labor Party Congress, in which was decided the establishment of the Socialist Party and practically the dissolution of its predecessor. The members of the government proposed by the Labor Party were all included in the new party. Ylli Bufi's government had a total of 19 cabinet members and 4 secretaries of state, while Gramoz Pashko simultaneously served as Deputy Prime Minister and Minister of Economy.

See also
 Politics of Albania
 Council of Ministers of Albania

Notes

Sources

References

G52
1991 establishments in Albania
Ministries established in 1991
Cabinets established in 1991